The Life and Extraordinary Adventures of Private Ivan Chonkin is a 1994 war comedy film directed by Jiří Menzel, based on the first two books of Vladimir Voinovich's novel trilogy of the same name. An international co-production between Russia, Czech Republic, the United Kingdom, France and Italy, it entered the competition at the 51st Venice International Film Festival, in which it won the President of the Italian Senate's Gold Medal.

Plot
The film is set in 1941 in the Soviet Union, before and during the first months of its involvement in World War II.

A military plane is forced to make an emergency landing near the small village of Krasnoye. The plane is unable to be easily removed, and so Ivan Chonkin is sent to guard it.

Chonkin is a soldier serving with a military unit stationed near the village. An unpretentious and simple man, and far from an exemplary soldier, Ivan is serving his conscription time in the logistical division of the regiment, helping to cook the unit’s meals and move supplies about.

Chonkin is sent to the village and, eventually finds accommodation with the village postmistress Nura. Soon he moves the aeroplane to the courtyard of Nura’s hut and moves in with her permanently.

Cast 
Gennady Nazarov – Ivan Chonkin
Zoya Buryak – Nyura
Vladimir Ilyin – Golubev
Aleksei Zharkov – Gladishev
Valeri Zolotukhin – Kilin
Zinovy Gerdt – Moisei Stalin
Sergei Garmash – Milyaga
Maria Vinogradova – Granny Dunia
Yuri Dubrovin – Volkov
Marián Labuda – Opalikov
Aleksandr Garin – Svintsov

References

Further reading

External links

1994 films
1990s war comedy films
Films directed by Jiří Menzel
Czech war comedy films
Russian war comedy films
Films with screenplays by Zdeněk Svěrák
1994 comedy films
Films based on Russian novels
Films based on science fiction novels
Movies! affiliates
Russian World War II films
Czech World War II films
British World War II films
1990s British films
Czech parody films